= Hinemoa laxefuniculata =

Scientific classification
- Kingdom: Animalia
- Phylum: Mollusca
- Class: Gastropoda
- Family: Pyramidellidae
- Genus: Hinemoa
- Species: H. laxefuniculata

Binomial name
- Hinemoa laxefuniculata Robba, Di Geronimo, Chaimanee, Negri & Sanfilippo, 2004

Species of gastropod

Hinemoa laxefuniculata is a species of sea snail, a marine gastropod mollusk in the family Pyramidellidae, the pyrams and their allies.
